Scavengers' Paradise is a TVB period drama series broadcast in April 2005.

Synopsis
Tang Wai-Cheung (Roger Kwok) leaves mainland China to 1960s Hong Kong to look for his long lost relative Tang Geng-Jue (Kenneth Ma). Tang Wai-Cheung falls in love with Cheng Bik-Wan (Myolie Wu).  They all live together in a poor HK housing project. Eventually, they all get rich from a family inheritance. The story has elements of comedy and musical.

Cast

External links
TVB.com Scavengers' Paradise - Official Website 

TVB dramas
2005 Hong Kong television series debuts
2005 Hong Kong television series endings